The County Books series, by Robert Hale and Company of London, covered counties and regions in the British Isles. It was launched in March 1947, and began with Kent, Surrey and Sussex. The series was announced as completed in 1954, in 60 volumes, with Lowlands of Scotland: Edinburgh and the South by Maurice Lindsay. The announced intention was to give "a true and lively picture of each county and people".

Brian Vesey-Fitzgerald was general editor of the County Books, and he also edited a series of Regional Books for Robert Hale. Both series were eulogistic about the countryside.

The County Books

See also
 Portrait Books series
 The Regional Books

References

External links
Library Thing page

Series of non-fiction books
1940s books
1950s books
Robert Hale (publishers)
Robert Hale books